Sindhamal Sitharamal ( Without dropping, without spoiling) is a 2003 Indian Tamil-language drama film directed by Shanmugavel. The film stars Abbas, Nanditha and Sona, while Karunas and Rajesh also appear in supporting roles. The film was released on 25 December 2003.

Cast

Soundtrack
Soundtrack was composed by Bharani.

Release
The film had a low profile release on 25 December 2003. A reviewer from The Hindu stated "it was a neat film which loses track towards the end" and added that "Shanmugavel ought to have avoided stuffing too many incidents into the storyline all of a sudden", while "at the same time he has to be complimented for a clean venture — a feature that is so hard to come by these days". A critic form Sify.com labelled the film as "average", noting that "Sona is strikingly sweet as Raziya and Abbas is back in form after a long break", while "Nandita come out with an impressive portrayal as Janaki". The critic added "surprisingly there is no mandatory comedy track and the debutant director has to be applauded for making a clean film".

References

2003 films
2000s Tamil-language films
2003 romantic drama films
Indian romantic drama films
2003 directorial debut films